Majk Abbey (Hungarian: Majk Apátság, Hungarian: Majk Abbey) is a Camaldolese abbey in Hungary and contains hermit houses (monastic cells) and a monastery church.

References

Roman Catholic monasteries in Hungary
Camaldolese monasteries